Syed Hasanur Rahman (born April 19, 1974) popularly known as Hasan, is a Bengali singer-songwriter and lead vocalist of the Bangladeshi popular Rock band Ark. He joined the band in 1996 as the main vocalist.  After six years of journey with the band, Hasan left the Ark in 2002 and formed new band Swadhinata in 2004.

Hasan performed more than 200 songs. But after two years he formed Janmabhumi, though in late 2010 Hasan re-joined the band Ark.

Early life
In 1989–90, Hasan was admitted to a certificate course on folk music at Bulbul Lalitakala Academy.

Personal life
Hasan married to Farhana Mazid in August 2000, who was born in Comilla. The couple have a son (Hasin) and a daughter (Nurjahan), all currently living in Lalmatia, Dhaka.

Awards and nominations

Meril Prothom Alo Awards

References

20th-century Bangladeshi male singers
20th-century Bangladeshi singers
Bangladeshi male singer-songwriters
Living people
1974 births
21st-century Bangladeshi male singers
21st-century Bangladeshi singers